Wilbert Carl "Webb" Schultz (January 31, 1898 – July 26, 1986) was a Major League Baseball pitcher. In one career game, he had a 0–0 record, going one inning, and giving up one run and one hit. He batted and threw left-handed.

Schultz was born in Wautoma, Wisconsin and died in Delavan, Wisconsin.

External links

1898 births
1986 deaths
Chicago White Sox players
Major League Baseball pitchers
Baseball players from Wisconsin
People from Waushara County, Wisconsin
Ripon Red Hawks baseball players
Wisconsin–La Crosse Eagles baseball players
People from Delavan, Wisconsin